Jeanette Pohlen (born May 2, 1989) is an American professional basketball player who is currently a free agent. As a collegiate athlete recruited by Stanford University, she was known by Cardinal fans for her great play against the Lady Huskies of the University of Connecticut when she scored 31 points leading Stanford to victory over the undefeated Huskies. Born in Downey, California, Pohlen appeared in 4 straight Final Fours at Stanford; including three straight Championship games.  Pohlen captured her first gold medal in international competition as a member of the USA Basketball World University Games Team in July 2009.

Stanford statistics

Source

USA Basketball
Pohlen was named a member of the team representing the US at the 2009 World University Games held in Belgrade, Serbia. The team won all seven games to earn the gold medal. Pohlen averaged 5.0 points per game.

WNBA
Pohlen was selected in the first round of the 2011 WNBA Draft (9th overall) by the Indiana Fever. Recognized for her long range shooting, Pohlen led the league in three point shooting percentage in 2011.

In 2012, Pohlen won her first WNBA championship with the Fever after they defeated the Minnesota Lynx in the Finals. In 2014, Pohlen was waived by the Fever during training camp due to an achilles injury.

In 2015, she rejoined the Fever after recovery.

In 2016, Pohlen was waived once again by the Fever a week before the start of the season. Midway through the season, she returned to the Fever signing a 7-day contract on July 6, 2016. A week later she signed another 7-day contract with the Fever. On July 21, 2016, she re-signed with the Fever for the rest of the season.

In February 2017, Pohlen re-signed with the Fever.

In February 2018, Pohlen re-signed once again with the Fever. In May 2018, Pohlen was waived by the Fever before the start of the 2018 WNBA season.

WNBA statistics

Regular season

|- 
| style="text-align:left;"| 2011
| style="text-align:left;"| Indiana
| 34 || 2 || 15.9||.471 || style="background:#D3D3D3"|.468° || .867 || 1.4 || 1.0 || 0.4 || 0.1 || 0.6 ||4.1
|-
|style="text-align:left;background:#afe6ba;"|  2012†
| style="text-align:left;"| Indiana
| 34 || 3 ||16.9|| .430 || .421 ||.700 || 1.7 || 1.1 || 0.6 || 0.3 || 0.9 || 4.4
|-
| style="text-align:left;"| 2013
| style="text-align:left;"| Indiana
| 13 || 0 || 14.7 ||.342 ||.375 || 1.000|| 1.9|| 0.3 || 0.5 || 0.1 || 0.8 || 3.2
|-
| style="text-align:left;"| 2015
| style="text-align:left;"| Indiana
| 26 || 1 || 10.0 || .404 || .395 || .750 || 0.8 || 0.6 || 0.5 || 0.0 || 0.4 || 2.4
|-
| style="text-align:left;"| 2016
| style="text-align:left;"| Indiana
| 12 || 0 || 4.1 ||.545 ||.500|| 1.000|| 0.1 || 0.4 || 0.0 || 0.0 ||0.2 || 1.3
|-
| style="text-align:left;"| 2017
| style="text-align:left;"| Indiana
| 29 || 0 || 12.9 ||.405 ||.385 || .826 || 1.0 || 0.7 || 0.2 || 0.0 || 0.6 || 3.4
|-
| style="text-align:left;"| Career
| style="text-align:left;"|6 years, 1 team
|148||6||13.4||.427||.420||.825||1.2||0.8||0.4||0.1||0.6||3.4

Playoffs

|-
| style="text-align:left;"| 2011
| style="text-align:left;"| Indiana
| 5 || 0 || 7.0 || .500 || .500 || .000 || 0.8 || 0.6 || 0.2 || 0.0 || 0.2 || 2.0
|-
|style="text-align:left;background:#afe6ba;"| 2012†
| style="text-align:left;"| Indiana
| 6 || 0 || 11.5 || .778 || 1.000 || .000 || 0.7 || 0.3 || 0.5 || 0.0 || 0.8 || 3.2
|-
| style="text-align:left;"| 2013
| style="text-align:left;"| Indiana
| 3 || 0 || 11.1 || .308 || .111 || .000 || 1.0 || 0.3 || 0.0 || 0.3 || 0.3 || 3.0
|-
| style="text-align:left;"| 2015
| style="text-align:left;"| Indiana
| 6 || 0 || 4.5 || .000 || .000 || .000 || 0.2 || 0.2 || 0.0 || 0.0 || 0.0 || 0.0
|-
| style="text-align:left;"| Career
| style="text-align:left;"|4 years, 1 team
| 20 || 0 ||  8.2 || .441 || .364 || .000 || 0.6 || 0.4 || 0.2 || 0.1 || 0.4 || 1.9

Overseas
Pohlen played the 2011–12 season with Tarsus in Turkey. She averaged 10.1 points in 13 games with the team.

Personal life
Pohlen has an uncle who played football at the University of Notre Dame, both her grandfather and great-grandfather played basketball at Purdue University and her great-uncle is inducted into the Texas A&M Basketball Hall of Fame.

References

1989 births
Living people
All-American college women's basketball players
American expatriate basketball people in Turkey
American women's basketball players
Basketball players from California
Guards (basketball)
Indiana Fever draft picks
Indiana Fever players
Sportspeople from Downey, California
Stanford Cardinal women's basketball players
Universiade gold medalists for the United States
Universiade medalists in basketball
Medalists at the 2009 Summer Universiade